The women's 400 metres at the 2012 World Junior Championships in Athletics was held at the Estadi Olímpic Lluís Companys on 11, 12, and 13 July.

Medalists

Records
, the existing world junior and championship records were as follows.

Results

Heats

Qualification: first 3 of each heat (Q) plus the 6 fastest times (q) qualified

Semi-finals

Qualification: first 2 of each heat (Q) plus the 2 fastest times (q) qualified

Final

Participation
According to an unofficial count, 40 athletes from 30 countries participated in the event.

References

External links
WJC12 400 metres schedule

400 metres
400 metres at the World Athletics U20 Championships
2012 in women's athletics